Hippodamia convergens, commonly known as the convergent lady beetle, is one of the most common lady beetles in North America and is found throughout the continent. Aphids form their main diet and they are used for the biological control of these pests.

Range
Convergent lady beetles are native to North America, but have also been imported and established in South America by importing beetles from California.

Life cycle
The female lady beetle lays 200 to 300 eggs over several months during spring and early summer. The eggs are small and spindle-shaped and are laid near the prey in upright batches of fifteen to thirty eggs. The larvae are dark and somewhat alligator-shaped. Once the larvae begin feeding, they grow quickly and molt four times over a period of up to a month. The pupal stage lasts about a week and mating takes place soon after adult eclosion. If the food supply is abundant, the female may start laying within about a week of mating, but if it is scarce, she may wait for up to nine months.

Biology

The first larvae that hatch in each batch may start by eating the unhatched eggs. This may provide energy for the larvae before they find any aphids. Fourth-instar larvae may consume about fifty aphids per day and adults may eat about twenty. When aphids are scarce, the adults can eat honeydew, nectar and pollen or even petals and other soft parts of plants. However they must consume aphids in order to reproduce. 
In the western United States, these beetles may spend up to nine months in diapause in large aggregations in mountain valleys, far from their aphid food sources. In spring, the adults spread out and search for suitable sites to lay their eggs where aphids are plentiful. This dispersal trait is especially marked in this species as compared to other lady beetles.

Biological control
Convergent lady beetles are also used for augmentative biological control to temporarily increase predator numbers to control aphids. The species is available commercially in North America, but because of the overwintering habits of non-reproductive adults, released beetles tend to quickly disperse from their release site. Adults released in enclosed settings such as greenhouses can contribute to lower aphid numbers.

Natural enemies
Entomopathogenic fungi used as biopesticides such as Metarhizium anisopliae, Paecilomyces fumosoroseus, and Beauveria bassiana can also infect larvae.

References

External links 

 http://www.ipm.ucdavis.edu/PMG/NE/convergent_lady_beetle.html
 http://www.biocontrol.entomology.cornell.edu/predators/ladybeetles.html
 OSU Agricultural Extension Fact Sheet - ENT-45
 http://bugguide.net/node/view/8374
 Convergent Lady Beetle Video on Vimeo Macro videography of Convergent Lady Beetle colony

Coccinellidae
Insects used as insect pest control agents
Biological pest control beetles
Beetles of North America
Beetles described in 1842